Muskogee High School (MHS) is a three-year public high school in Muskogee, Oklahoma, U.S.. It is accredited by the Oklahoma State Department of Education and the Oklahoma Secondary School Activities Association.

Muskogee High School is part of the Muskogee Independent School District No. 20 of Muskogee County, Oklahoma, more commonly known as Muskogee Public Schools.

School history

In August 2018 the school administration announced that any student who, within a four-week period, is late to classes four times would receive a fine of $250. At the same time, the administration stated that safety concerns caused it to ban students from wandering around the campus during lunch times, increase class times, and reduce the times of lunch periods. According to a KOCO-TV article, students planned to protest the new rules.

Academics

Muskogee High School offers a wide range of academic courses.

Advanced Placement Program
The Advanced Placement (AP) Program provides college-level courses to MHS student through AP courses. Through AP Exams, students have the opportunity to earn credit or advanced standing at most of the nation's colleges and universities.

Concurrent enrollment
Juniors and seniors of exceptional ability are provided with the opportunity to gain college credit while completing their high school education. School counselors must verify that prerequisites are met and that enrollment in the college course has been completed, including payment for the course(s), prior to concurrent enrollment being changed on a student's schedule.

Special Education Department
Muskogee High School provides comprehensive services to qualifying students.

Technology and Business Department
Through different programs at MHS students are allowed to incorporate work experience into their academic plans. The DECA program allows students to attends MHS half the day and maintain a job the other half. Students interested in technical and career-specific skills to prepare for such careers as automotive, child care, computers, construction, cosmetology, industrial technology, health care, and landscape may enroll in programs at the Muskogee Indian Capital Technology Center, affiliated with the Oklahoma Department of Career and Technology Education.

Athletics

Basketball
State championship (Muskogee High): 1975

Football
State Championships (Central High): 1910 – 1914  – 1919 – 1920 – 1923 – 1925 – 1935 – 1940 – 1947 – 1948 – 1949 – 1950 – 1951

State Championship (Muskogee High) : 1986

Softball
State Championship (Muskogee High) : 1983, 1998, 2000, 2009

The Rougher Softball Team was also named the Class 6A Academic State Champions in 2013, with a team GPA of 3.7.

Student clubs and organizations

Air Force JROTC
African-American Heritage Club
Art Club
Asian Club
Business Professionals of America
Muskogee Schools of Character Initiative
Chess Club
Choir
DECA
Ecology Club
Family, Career, and Community Leaders of America (FCCLA)
Future Farmers of America (FFA)
Film Society
French Club
Future Educators of America
Gender-Sexuality Alliance (GSA)
History Buffs
Junior Classical League
Math Club
21st Century After School Program
National Honor Society
National Forensic League
Oklahoma Honor Society
Pride of Muskogee (MHS marching band)
Roughers Against Illegal Drugs (RAID)
Revolution Color Guard / Winterguard
Science Club
Skills USA – VICA
Speech Club
Muskogee High School Student Council
Students Against Drunk Driving
Students Working Against Tobacco (SWAT)
Teens for Christ
The Chieftain (MHS yearbook)
The Scout (MHS newspaper)
Young Democrats
Young Republicans
Youth Volunteer Corps (YVC)
All School Musical
Academic Pursuit Team
Fellowship of Christian Athletes (FCA)
Nutrition Advisory Council

Notable alumni
Archie Bradley, professional baseball player (transferred to Broken Arrow Senior High School)
Bo Bolinger – football player
Kamren Curl – football player
John Tyler Hammons – former mayor of Muskogee
George Faught – current State Representative for Muskogee
Drew Edmondson – former Attorney General of Oklahoma and 2018 Democratic nominee for governor 
Ed Edmondson – former Congressman for Oklahoma's 2nd District
James E. Edmondson – current Oklahoma Supreme Court justice
J. Howard Edmondson – former Oklahoma Governor and Senator
Mike Synar – former Oklahoma Congress from Oklahoma's 2nd District
Ernest E. Evans – Commander, United States Navy. Died in combat 1944.
Jack Jacobs – former Canadian Football League quarterback and one of the original inductees to the Canadian Football Hall of Fame.
Glen D. Johnson, Jr. – current Chancellor of the Oklahoma State System of Higher Education
Seth Littrell – Former head football coach of North Texas
Robert Reed – actor.
Robert Thomas – NFL defensive lineman for the New York Giants
Stacy McGee - football player

References

Public high schools in Oklahoma
Buildings and structures in Muskogee, Oklahoma
Schools in Muskogee County, Oklahoma
1970 establishments in Oklahoma